Hugh Miller (22 May 18891 November 1976) was a British stage and film actor. He was instrumental in founding the original London Film Society in 1925, but left soon afterwards to work in America. He found success on Broadway, as Mr. Jingle in Pickwick in 1927; and in Hollywood, in the Gloria Swanson film The Love of Sunya, that same year. Miller was cast as dialogue coach for Lawrence of Arabia (1962), and was mentor to actor Peter O'Toole from early in his career, and recommended Miller to Lean. Miller, who was one of several members of a David Lean film crew to be given bit parts, was hired again as dialogue coach in Doctor Zhivago (1965), his last screen effort before his death in 1976.

Miller married Olga Katzin, a satirical poet who published under the name Sagittarius, in 1921; they had three children.

Filmography

 In His Grip (1921) as Alec Vicars (film debut)
 The Puppet Man (1921) as Alcide le Beau
 Darkness (1923) as Keever
 Bonnie Prince Charlie (1923) as Robert Fraser
 Claude Duval (1924) as Lord Lionel Malyn
 The City of Temptation (1925)
 Venetian Lovers (1925) as Count Astoni
 The Prude's Fall (1925) as Marquis de Rocqueville
 Blind Alleys (1927) as Julio Lachados
 The Love of Sunya (1927) as The Outcast
 The Green Pack (1934) as Martin Creet
 The Divine Spark (1935) as Paganini
 McGlusky the Sea Rover (1935) as Karim
 I Give My Heart (1935) as Choiseul
 The Dominant Sex (1937) as Philip Carson
 Spring Handicap (1937) as Selby
 The Vicar of Bray (1937) as King Charles I
 Bulldog Drummond at Bay (1937) as Ivan Kalinsky
 Victoria the Great (1937) as Older Disraeli
 Return of the Scarlet Pimpernel (1937) as De Calmet, Robespierre's Secretary
 The Rat (1937) as Luis Stets
 I'll Walk Beside You (1943) as Dr. Stevenson
 The Woman in the Hall (1947) as Mr. Walker
 Calling Paul Temple (1948) as Doctor
 My Sister and I (1948) as Hubert Bondage
 Before I Wake (1955) as Mr. Driscoll
 The Gelignite Gang (1956) as Mr. Crosby
 Behind the Mask (1958) as Examiner
 Lawrence of Arabia (1962) as R.A.M.C. Colonel (final film role)

References

External links

1889 births
1976 deaths
English male stage actors
English male film actors
People from Berwick-upon-Tweed
20th-century English male actors
Date of death missing